Gimme Some! is the final album by vibraphonist Freddie McCoy recorded in 1971 and released on the Cobblestone label.

Reception
Allmusic called the album "a circa-1971 jazz-funk session featuring some trippy electric piano work".

Track listing 
All compositions by Freddie McCoy except where noted.
 "Oh Happy Day" (Edwin Hawkins) – 3:54  
 "Light My Fire" (The Doors) – 6:19  
 "Gimme Some!" – 2:46  
 "This Guy's in Love with You" (Burt Bacharach, Hal David) – 3:17  
 "Aquarius" (James Rado, Gerome Ragni, Galt MacDermot) – 3:32  
 "The Worst That Could Happen" (Jimmy Webb) – 3:16  
 "Hey Jude" (John Lennon, Paul McCartney) – 6:12  
 "Time for My Children" – 4:19

Personnel 
Freddie McCoy – vibraphone

References 

Freddie McCoy albums
1971 albums
Cobblestone Records albums